Jack LaFontaine (born January 6, 1998) is a Canadian professional ice hockey goaltender currently playing for the  Syracuse Crunch of the American Hockey League (AHL). He was drafted 75th overall by the Carolina Hurricanes in the 2016 NHL Entry Draft.

Playing career

Junior
After spending two seasons at Michigan, primarily serving as a backup goaltender, LaFontaine signed with the Penticton Vees of the British Columbia Hockey League (BCHL) on June 18, 2018. During the 2018–19 season, he posted a 30–13–1 record with a 2.19 goals-against average (GAA) and .923 save percentage. Following an outstanding season, he was named BCHL's Top Goaltender.

College
LaFontaine began his collegiate career for the University of Michigan during the 2016–17 season. During his freshman season, he appeared in 11 games, where he posted a 1–7–1 record, with a 3.34 GAA and .911 save percentage. During his sophomore season, he appeared in 11 games, where he posted a 4–4 record, with a 3.51 GAA and .889 save percentage.

On August 20, 2019, LaFontaine enrolled at the University of Minnesota. During his junior season, he posted a 9–9–6 record, with a 2.55 GAA and .919 save percentage, in a COVID-19 shortened season. He made his debut for the Gophers on October 11, 2019 in a game against Colorado College.

During his senior season, LaFontaine was the national leader in wins (21–6–0) and save percentage (.936) while ranking second in goals against average (1.74), among goalies that have started at least half their team's games. He was tied for second nationally in shutouts with five. He entered the NCAA tournament having allowed two goals or fewer in 26 of his last 21 starts dating back to the end of the 2019–20 season. LaFontaine set two program records for single-season save percentage (.934) and single-season goals against average (1.79). Following an outstanding season, he was named to the All-Big Ten First Team, Big Ten Goaltender of the Year, and awarded the Mike Richter Award.

On April 2, 2021, LaFontaine announced he would return to Minnesota for a fifth year during the 2021–22 season. On January 9, 2022, LaFontaine signed a one-year, entry-level contract with the Carolina Hurricanes.

Professional
On January 9, 2022, LaFontaine signed a one-year, entry-level contract with the Carolina Hurricanes.After appearing in two games with the Hurricanes, LaFontaine would split the rest of the season between the AHL and ECHL.

As an impending restricted free agent following the conclusion of his entry-level contract, LaFontaine was released as a free agent after he was not tendered a qualifying offer by the Hurricanes. On July 25, 2022, LaFontaine was signed to a one-year AHL contract with the Syracuse Crunch, the primary affiliate to the Tampa Bay Lightning.During the 2022–23 season, LaFontaine was suspended six games after leaving the players’ bench during an altercation and attempting to fight Rochester Americans goaltender Malcolm Subban at the conclusion of the third period.

Career statistics

Awards and honors

References

External links
 

1998 births
Living people
AHCA Division I men's ice hockey All-Americans
Canadian ice hockey goaltenders
Carolina Hurricanes draft picks
Carolina Hurricanes players
Chicago Wolves players
Ice hockey people from Ontario
Michigan Wolverines men's ice hockey players
Minnesota Golden Gophers men's ice hockey players
Norfolk Admirals (ECHL) players
Orlando Solar Bears (ECHL) players
Penticton Vees players
Sportspeople from Mississauga